Tannaz Farsi (born 1974) is an Iranian-born American multidisciplinary visual artist and educator. Farsi is an Associate Professor of sculpture at the University of Oregon. She lives in Eugene, Oregon.

Biography 
Tannaz Farsi was born in 1974 in Tehran, Pahlavi Iran. Farsi received her BFA degree (2004) from West Virginia University; and her MFA degree (2007) from Ohio University.

Farsi has had solo exhibitions at the Linfield Gallery at SculptureCenter (2008); the Barron and Elin Gordon Galleries, Old Dominion University; Ohge Ltd, Seattle (2009); Delaware Center for Contemporary Art (2010); Disjecta (2011); Pitzer College Art Galleries (2013); and Linfield College (2017).

Farsi has had group exhibitions include at 1708 Gallery in Richmond, Virginia; Jordan Schnitzer Museum of Art; Urban Institute of Contemporary Art in Grand Rapids, Michigan; Tacoma Art Museum; Schneider Museum of Art at Southern Oregon University; Gallery Homeland, Portland, Oregon; and the PDX Film Festival. She participated in the 2016 Portland Biennial at Oregon Contemporary.

Farsi has been awarded artist-in-residencies at Djerassi Artists Residency, Ucross Foundation, MacDowell Colony, and the Bemis Center for Contemporary Art. In 2014, she was a Hallie Ford Fellow in the Visual Arts, through the Ford Family Foundation.

In 2019, Farsi was featured in a group exhibit of Iranian-American artists titled, "Part and Parcel" at the San Francisco Arts Commission's main gallery.

See also 
 List of Iranian women artists

References

External links 
 Official website

Living people
American women artists
Artists from Oregon
Ohio University alumni
University of Oregon faculty
West Virginia University alumni
American women academics
21st-century American women
1974 births